The 2008 Estoril Open was a tennis tournament played on outdoor clay courts. It was the 19th edition of the Estoril Open for the men (the 12th for the women), and was part of the International Series of the 2008 ATP Tour, and of the Tier IV Series of the 2008 WTA Tour. Both the men's and the women's events took place at the Estádio Nacional in Oeiras, Portugal, from April 14 through April 20, 2008.

The men's draw featured World No. 1, reigning Wimbledon and US Open champion, Australian Open semifinalist Roger Federer, ATP No. 4, Miami Masters winner and 2003 Estoril titlist Nikolay Davydenko, and Rotterdam semifinalist Ivo Karlović. Other seeded players were Australian Open quarterfinalist and Adelaide runner-up Jarkko Nieminen, Rotterdam semifinalist Gilles Simon, Nicolas Mahut, Marc Gicquel and Michael Berrer.

The women's draw was headlined by Viña del Mar and Acapulco champion Flavia Pennetta, Auckland quarterfinalist Maria Kirilenko, and Antwerp runner-up Karin Knapp. Also present in the field were 2005 Estoril titlist Lucie Šafářová, 2000 Estoril semifinalist Tathiana Garbin, Klára Zakopalová, Sofia Arvidsson and Camille Pin.

Finals

Men's singles

 Roger Federer defeated  Nikolay Davydenko 7–6(7–5), 1–2 retired
It was Roger Federer's 1st title of the year, and his 54th overall.

Women's singles

 Maria Kirilenko defeated  Iveta Benešová, 6–4, 6–2
It was Maria Kirilenko's 1st title of the year, and her 3rd overall.

Men's doubles

 Jeff Coetzee /  Wesley Moodie defeated  Jamie Murray /  Kevin Ullyett, 6–2, 4–6, [10–8]

Women's doubles

 Maria Kirilenko /  Flavia Pennetta defeated  Mervana Jugić-Salkić /  İpek Şenoğlu, 6–4, 6–4

External links
Official website
Men's Singles Draw
Men's Doubles Draw
Men's Qualifying Singles Draw
Women's Singles, Doubles and Qualifying Singles Draws

2008
2008 ATP Tour
2008 WTA Tour
2008 in Portuguese tennis